Kevin Kato Hammond is an American musician, author, publisher and journalist.  He is the owner and creator of Take Me Out To The Go-Go, Inc. (TMOTTGoGo), editor and publisher of Take Me Out To The Go-Go Magazine, executive producer of TMOTTGoGo DVD Magazine, and webmaster of TMOTTGoGo.com. Take Me Out to the Go-Go Magazine gains attention from outside media outlets for its designation as "the official gateway to a Washington, DC music culture."  Such magazines as Vibe have made Kevin Hammond and Take Me Out to the GoGo Magazine a significant source of information about the go-go music culture.   His history as a musician includes performing and recording with the go-go bands Pure Elegance, Little Benny & the Masters, and Proper Utensils.  Most recently he has served as co-music director of Fatal Attraction Band.

Kato is currently the director of marketing for Bag of Beats Records.  He is also the chairperson for history and archives for The GoGo Coalition.

Born in Washington, DC, Kevin "Kato" Hammond grew up in Seat Pleasant, Maryland, and attended the Duke Ellington School of the Arts in Washington, DC and Bowie High School in Bowie, Maryland.  As a child, he performed in DC area organizations such as CUE (Children's Urban Arts Ensemble), Bren-Carr Dancers and The T-N-T Poppers.  Hammond is also an award-winning playwright.  At the age of 17, he wrote a play entitled Buddies that listed in the finalist division of the Young Playwrights Inc. Young Playwrights Festival at the Public Theater. This play was performed Off-Broadway and starred Denzel Washington and Anna Maria Horsford, both of whom were lesser known actors at the time.

Take Me Out To The Go-Go (TMOTTGoGo)
Hammond started the online magazine Take Me Out To The Go-Go in 1996.  In addition to the magazine being a source of information on go-go shows, it serves as a community forum in which go-go fans routinely submit their own articles on issues unique to the genre.  Take Me Out To The Go-Go has expanded to include a radio station entitled TMOTTRadio.com, as well as a Web & Graphics Designing Service.

TMOTTGoGo Radio
Although producing online radio programs since 1998, in January 2012 Hammond brought the debut of TMOTTRadio.com.  The full broadcast platform of the station went into live programming in September 2014.  This addition to the TMOTT platform showcased programmed shows such as, 99 & Kato Radio Experience, The Adverbs, DaBizNest, Wisdom Speeks DC, The Know It Alls, Bubble Guts Radio, TMOTT Old School Show, Throwback Thursdays, Sunday's Praise, Purp Haze Show, The Bounce Zone, and The Grown & Sexy Side.

Take Me Out To The Go-Go: The Autobiography of Kato Hammond
In May 2015, Hammond published his autobiography, Take Me Out To The Go-Go.

Discography 

Studio albums
 Little Benny & The Masters - Getting Funky Up In Here (1991)
 Little Benny & The Masters – Take Me Out To The Go-Go (1992)
 Fatal Attraction - Rock It For Shawn (1995)
 Fatal Attraction - Grown & Crankin (1996)
 Soul Food (2020)
 Universe City (2020)
 Acoustically Yours (2020)

Filmography

Film

Television

See also
Go-Go Music
Chuck Brown
Anthony Harley
Little Benny & the Masters
Anwan Glover
Experience Unlimited
Trouble Funk
Junk Yard Band

External links
 
Kato Hammond - Media Mogul
The Autobiography of Kato Hammond
TMOTTGoGo Magazine
TMOTTGoGo Radio
TMOTT Web Design
Go-Go Coalition

References

 Coates, Ta-Nahisi (1999-09-02).  “Go-Go’s New Folio”, Washington City Paper, pp. 56.
 Lornell, Kip; Charles C. Stephenson, Jr. (2001). The Beat: Go-Go's Fusion of Funk and Hip-Hop. Billboard, .
 Brace, Eric (2001-02-23). “A Horde of Awards”, Washington Post, pp. T06.
 Wartofsky, Alona (2001-06-03).  "What Go-Goes Around…", Washington Post, pp. G01.
 Brace, Eric (2002-01-18). “Perkin’ On The Railroad”, Washington Post, pp. T05.
 Hopkinson, Natalie (2003-07-16).  “Low Budget Reality…” Washington Post, pp. A01.
 Smith-Barrow, Delece (2006-11-30).  “Awards Celebrate Go-Go’s Funk”,  Washington Post, pp. DZ03.
 Williams, Darona (2007-08-07).  “D.C. Cyber Funk”,  Washington Post Express, pp. 41.
 Wartofsky, Alona (2015-05-15).  “Kato Hammond, Go-Go’s De Facto Historian, Remembers His Roots”, Washington City Paper.
 Kiviat, Steve (2015-06-22).  “TV-One’s Unsung Documentary on Chuck Brown”, Washington City Paper.
 Kiviat, Steve (2015-05-15).  “The Story of Kato Hammond, The D.C. Go-Go Scene Best News Source”, WAMU Bandwidth.
 Mahdi, Tahira (2015-04-22).  “The Go-Go Book”, DC Brand 99.
 Relic, Peter (2015-08-03).  “Take Me Out: Kato's Must-Hear Go-Go Songs”, Mass Appeal.

American funk musicians
American male journalists
Living people
1965 births
Go-go musicians
People from Seat Pleasant, Maryland